Doris Bunte (July 2, 1933 – February 15, 2021) was a Massachusetts state representative and an administrator of the Boston Housing Authority. She was the first African-American woman to hold either position.

Biography
She was born on July 2, 1933, in New York City and educated in the New York City public schools.

She was a tenant activist at the Orchard Park housing project (now Orchard Gardens) in Roxbury. She was a member of the National Rent Board, the Critical Minority Affairs Committee, the National Association of Housing and Redevelopment Officials, the National Tenants Organization, and the Citizens Housing and Planning Association.

In 1972, Bunte was elected to the Massachusetts House of Representatives (7th Suffolk District, Wards 8, 9 and 12), where she served for 12 years. She was the first African-American woman elected to the Massachusetts state legislature. In 1984, Mayor Raymond Flynn appointed her Administrator of the Boston Housing Authority, where she served until 1992. She was also the first BHA official who had lived in public housing. She was the first African-American woman to hold that position in Boston, and the first former public housing tenant to lead a public housing agency in a major city. During her career in Massachusetts politics she was known as a strong advocate for public housing. Bunte was among the three founding members of the Massachusetts Legislative Black Caucus. 

Afterwards she worked at the Boston University School of Public Health and the Center for Sport in Society at Northeastern University before retiring in 2010.

She died on February 15, 2021, from cancer in her home in Brookline, Massachusetts.

Honors
In 2018, the Walnut Park Apartments were renamed the Doris Bunte Apartments.

See also 
 Massachusetts House of Representatives' 9th Suffolk district
 168th Massachusetts General Court (1973–1974)
 169th Massachusetts General Court (1975–1976)
 170th Massachusetts General Court (1977–1978)
 171st Massachusetts General Court (1979–1980)
 172nd Massachusetts General Court (1981–1982)
 173rd Massachusetts General Court (1983–1984)

References

Further reading
 

1933 births
2021 deaths
Members of the Massachusetts House of Representatives
Women state legislators in Massachusetts
African-American state legislators in Massachusetts
African-American women in politics
People from Roxbury, Boston
Politicians from New York City
Deaths from cancer in Massachusetts
20th-century African-American people
20th-century African-American women
21st-century African-American people
21st-century African-American women